Pseudomonas mucidolens is a Gram-negative, non-sporulating, motile, rod bacterium that causes mustiness in eggs. Based on 16S rRNA analysis, P. mucidolens has been placed in the P. fluorescens group.

References

External links
Type strain of Pseudomonas mucidolens at BacDive -  the Bacterial Diversity Metadatabase

Pseudomonadales
Bacteria described in 1932